Thomas Nilsson may refer to:
 Thomas Nilsson (athlete)
 Thomas Nilsson (footballer)